Mohamed Iltaf Sheikh, Baron Sheikh (13 June 1941 – 22 September 2022) was a British politician and businessman. He was formerly an insurance broker and underwriter.

Early life and professional career 
Mohamed Sheikh was born in Kenya and raised in Uganda. He arrived in the UK in 1962 and later studied at the Holborn College of Law, Languages and Commerce and the City College of London. Lord Sheikh then received training at a major insurance company, Sun Alliance and London Group.

Previously, he was the chairman and Chief Executive of Lloyd's Brokers, Camberford Law PLC.

He was also chairman of companies relating to Property and other businesses.

Barony 
Lord Sheikh was appointed a life peer in 2006 after he was nominated by Michael Howard MP, then Leader of the Conservative Party. The life barony conferred upon Mohamed Iltaf Sheikh was gazetted on 6 June 2006 by the name, style and title of Baron Sheikh, of Cornhill in the City of London.

He founded and Co-Chaired the All Party Parliamentary Group (APPG) for Islamic and Ethical Finance in British Parliament. He was co-chair of the APPG on Turkey and the Prevention of Genocide and Crimes Against Humanity. He was also a vice-chair of the APPGs on Bangladesh, Ethiopia, Nepal, Kazakhstan and Tajikistan.

Conservative Party 
Sheikh first joined the Conservative Party in 2004. He founded the Conservative Muslim Forum and chaired it for several years. He was President of the Forum. He sat on the Conservative benches in the House of Lords and he was actively involved in promoting the Conservative Party to ethnic minorities.

National Muslim War Memorial Trust 
Lord Sheikh was the chairman and a founding member of the recently established National Muslim War Memorial Trust.

Defamation case 

On 15 August 2018 MailOnline published an article headed "EXCLUSIVE: Top Tory Peer’s appearance at Corbyn's 'hate conference' in Tunisia comes after YEARS of rubbing shoulders with Islamists, hate preachers and Holocaust deniers". This started the Corbyn wreath-laying controversy. Lord Sheikh took action against the publishers, Associated Newspapers Ltd who later accepted fault, admitted their allegations were false, and issued an apology.

Personal life 
Sheikh died on 22 September 2022, at the age of 81.

Arms

Bibliography

References

External links 
 
 

1941 births
2022 deaths
British businesspeople
Conservative Party (UK) life peers
Kenyan emigrants to the United Kingdom
Life peers created by Elizabeth II
British politicians of Pakistani descent
British Muslims